"The Beta Cloud" is the fourteenth episode of the second series of Space: 1999 (and the thirty-eighth episode overall of the programme).  The screenplay was written by Charles Woodgrove (a pseudonym of producer Fred Freiberger); the director was Robert Lynn.  The final shooting script is dated 11 June 1976.  Live action filming took place Monday 26 July 1976 through Friday 6 August 1976.  A two-day remount was scheduled for Tuesday 21 September 1976 through Wednesday 22 September 1976 during production of the two-part episode "The Bringers of Wonder".

Story 
It is 1503 days after leaving Earth orbit, and Moonbase Alpha is suffering a massive epidemic.  Lassitude, depression and loss-of-will have incapacitated the majority of the population.  Only a few dozen remain healthy to nurse the sick and keep essential services running.  Seven days previously, the Moon encountered a massive cloud composed of unknown elements and exhibiting strange characteristics.  Soon after the sighting, people began passing out all over the base—John Koenig and Alan Carter among them.  Working alone, Doctor Helena Russell was unable to identify the cause of the disease.

Four days previously, Astronaut Tom Graham was dispatched to collect particles for analysis in the hope the causative agent could be found and a treatment devised.  After steering Eagle Six into the cloud, Graham was never heard from again—until today.  Tracking radar suddenly picks up Eagle Six on final approach.  Relief turns to doubt when the staff realises the ship should have exhausted its fuel two days previously, there is no response to hails, and sensors show no life-forms on board.  Tony Verdeschi, Bill Fraser and one of three still-healthy Security guards go to meet the mystery ship as it lands.

Boarding the Eagle, there is no sign of Graham.  The search ends when the men are ambushed by a vicious alien beast.  After proving resistant to stun-gun fire, the seven-foot-tall, frog-headed, enormously-muscled brute crushes the guard to death with its bare hands.  Verdeschi and Fraser only just manage to escape via the travel tube.  The security chief has the remaining two guards to report to the travel-tube terminus armed with heavy rocket guns.  He orders them to immediately fire on anything following him out of the travel unit.

All attempts to analyse the cloud meet with failure.  An unknown emission is scrambling the sensors; all they show is a large mass shrouded by gas and dust.  Verdeschi and company are startled by a transmission from the cloud.  The dispassionate voice informs them their life-support system is required for the survival of its race; an agent has been sent to take it—by force, if necessary.  The exchange is cut short by a report from the reception area; the beast is tearing through the travel-tube doors.  The Security men fire their rocket guns, but the creature shrugs off the impact of the explosive shells.  The guards resort to hand-to-hand combat and are effortlessly killed.

After witnessing the slaughter on the big screen, Verdeschi orders Maya and Sandra Benes to safety in the Medical Centre.  They arrive there and he issues a priority-one order to Computer:  all Moonbase doors are to remain locked and will open only on his voice command.  Verdeschi opens the main door—and finds the creature directly outside.  He and Fraser escape through an alternate exit.  As the beast ransacks Command Centre for life-support equipment, the two men split up.  Verdeschi will deal with the creature while Fraser establishes a defence at the Life-Support Centre.

In the overcrowded care unit, an ailing Koenig tries to join his men, but finds the door locked and the commlock panel unresponsive.  Before passing out, he tells the convalescing Carter to take over.  Carter contacts Verdeschi, who is preparing a trap in the Technical Section.  The workshop where the spacesuits are inspected and repaired is equipped with a steel-walled vacuum chamber; Verdeschi hopes to decoy the creature inside and evacuate the air, killing it.  Using himself as bait, he successfully lures the invader into the vacuum chamber.  After several minutes, he repressurises the chamber and opens the metre-thick hatch to verify the creature's death—and out it leaps, unharmed.

Verdeschi runs, but cannot elude it.  The beast has him in its clutches when Maya comes to his aid (having escaped from Medical by transforming into a mouse and crawling through an air-vent into the ventilation ducts).  After first trying and failing to mimic its form, the Psychon woman transforms into an alien animal and distracts the beast away from him.  The Maya/Animal takes a beating and Verdeschi forces the beast off her with a high-pressure carbon-dioxide fire hose.

Retreating to the Medical Section, they find Helena has contracted the illness.  Before losing consciousness, she recommends using a high-pressure injector gun to administer a massive dose of ionethermyecin, an anaesthetic agent too powerful for use in human beings.  Armed with the injector gun, they locate the creature in a main corridor via Alpha's CCTV network.  Verdeschi sounds the red-alert klaxon, confusing the invader, then broadcasts over the TV monitors on the communications post nearest to it.  When the creature is goaded into demolishing it, he switches to the communications post at the next intersection and then the next, successfully drawing the creature away from Life-Support.

Maya recommends leading it to an experimental chamber in Hydroponics, which can be filled with chlorine gas to suffocate it.  While they lay their trap, Carter contacts Fraser.  He orders the astronaut to construct a high-voltage cable barrier across the approach to the Life-Support Section, but Fraser does not have the experience.  Carter recalls Sandra Benes' expertise in electronics, and she gives Fraser step-by-step instructions.

Maya, in the form of a chlorine-breathing animal from the planet Kreno, decoys the creature into the chlorine-filled laboratory.  Watching from the corridor through an observation window, Verdeschi sees the creature is affected by neither the toxic atmosphere nor the anaesthetic dose.  Fighting for her life, the Maya/Kreno-Animal is trapped when she smashes into the commlock panel, jamming the door.  Verdeschi shatters the glass partition and she jumps to safety.  After leaving the Hydroponics Section, Verdeschi suggests Maya assume the form of the creature.  The metamorph informs him she already tried—though able to transform into any life-form, she is unable to copy its molecular structure.  The alien voice intrudes, telling them resistance is futile...simply give up the life-support system and die in peace.

As Fraser completes his barricade of heavy-gauge electrical cable and connects it to a mobile generator, Verdeschi and Maya track the unstoppable creature from a safe distance.  Maya breaks down emotionally, admitting defeat.  Verdeschi refuses to concede.  Standing outside the Weapons Section, he has an inspiration; if they cannot defeat the creature, then they should assault the beings controlling it.  Deploying one of Alpha's main batteries, they fire off several volleys of laser fire into the cloud.  The swirling gasses dissipate, revealing an indistinct shape.  They lock onto the new target and fire, the laser blast splitting the body cleanly down the middle.  Their success is short-lived as the object reforms.  They fire multiple bursts—first halving, then quartering the mass.  As the alien laughs maniacally, the object reassembles then withdraws deeper into the cloud.  They leave to join Fraser to make their final stand at Life-Support

They arrive only minutes ahead of the creature.  As Maya inspects Fraser's handiwork, the two men size-up the electrical barrier, then the standard-weight door at their backs.  If the barricade fails, they are done for.  The beast approaches, contemplates the obstruction, and grips a cable in its hands.  Thousands of volts surge through its body, knocking it flat on its back.  The three are shocked as it climbs to its feet.  It assaults the barrier again; the electric shock throws it to the floor, setting its fur ablaze.  It simply recovers and pats out the flames.

With defeat a certainty, Verdeschi pulls Maya aside.  After three years of flirtation, witty repartee and casual dating, he professes his love for her.  She responds with a passionate kiss until interrupted by the creature making another go at the barrier.  The electrical charge sends it reeling and Fraser blasts it with his rocket gun.  Verdeschi is dumbfounded; how can any life-form take this abuse?  Maya has an epiphany:  the creature is not a life-form, but a mechanical construct—a robot.  It is the only explanation for its survival against laser-fire, rocket shells, vacuum, chlorine, anaesthetic and electricity.

Her revelation is interrupted by the creature's latest onslaught; it leans its full weight against the cables and bursts through.  The three Alphans retreat into the Life-Support Centre.  Maya tries to determine an access point to the robot's internal mechanism while the men mount a desperate offensive.  Fraser is immediately slammed into a wall head-first and knocked out.  Next, Verdeschi is tossed aside, breaking his arm.  Maya perceives an opening at the creature's ear.  She transforms into a bee and buzzes around its head as it stalks toward the instrument banks.  It removes the core element from its slot and Moonbase goes dead —- lights dim, air purification and circulation ceases and the temperature begins to drop.  Verdeschi attempts to block the robot's exit, only to end up with a shattered knee.

The Maya/Bee enters the ear into the creature's head, where she finds an array of complicated circuitry.  She moves across the electronics, causing myriad short-circuits.  The robot beast stops in its tracks and drops the core.  Verdeschi drags himself across the floor to protect the component from the creature's wrath as, in its death throes, it vandalises the room.  His struggle to return the fragile element to its housing attracts the robot's attention and it moves in for the kill—then seizes up and keels over, inactive.  Verdeschi succeeds in replacing the core; life-support function resumes as he passes out.

Later, he finds himself in traction and alone in Medical; even Fraser's injuries were less severe.  With the destruction of its agent, the cloud vanished as mysteriously as it appeared and the epidemic with it.  Maya enters with a multitude of get-well gifts for her sweetheart.  As she fusses over him, he gives her a stumbling retraction of his declaration of love, dismissing it as 'wild garbage'.  Indignant, she collects her presents and storms out, leaving a smug Verdeschi knowing she really is crazy about him.

Cast

Starring 
Martin Landau — Commander John Koenig
Barbara Bain — Doctor Helena Russell

Also Starring 
Catherine Schell — Maya

Featuring 
Tony Anholt — Tony Verdeschi
Nick Tate — Captain Alan Carter
Zienia Merton — Sandra 'Sahn' Benes

Guest Star 
David Prowse — The Creature

Also Featuring 
 John Hug — Astronaut Bill Fraser
 Albin Pahernik — Maya/Space Animal and Maya/Kreno Animal

Uncredited Artists 
 Roy Everson — Les Johnson
 Joe Dunne — Security Guard
 Robert Reeves — Peter
 Marc Smith — Cloud Voice

Music 

The score was re-edited from previous Space: 1999 incidental music tracks composed for the second series by Derek Wadsworth and draws primarily from the scores of "One Moment of Humanity" and "Space Warp".  (Due to the necessity of shooting additional footage to complete this episode, post-production was delayed until after the completion of the subsequent episode "Space Warp", allowing music editor Alan Willis to make use of its score.)

Production Notes 

 Using the 'Charles Woodgrove' pen-name a second time, series producer Fred Freiberger wrote this script with the following brief: 'How do you defeat the undefeatable?'  It intrigued him that the Alphans could not defeat this creature with their considerable technical skills and ingenuity, yet a simple life-form (a bee) could bring about its downfall.  It also took into consideration that series stars Martin Landau and Barbara Bain would be available for only one filming day, as it was scheduled for production during the Landaus' contracted holiday in the south of France.  With the script relegating the leads to bed, the supporting ensemble found themselves with greatly expanded roles.  Always budget conscious, Freiberger refused the normal writer's fee, asking only to be reimbursed for expenses.
 During post-production, it became apparent that the episode would come in well under the required fifty-minute running time.  Several additional minutes were written and filmed six weeks later during the production of "The Bringers of Wonder".  The extra material included (1) A new 'hook', where the Alphans first encounter the cloud and the viewer witnesses its sinister effect on the Alphans' health (the script's original hook was a 'cold-open' with everyone already ill and Helena narrating her status report; this became the opening of Act One); (2) Additional footage of Fraser beginning work on the electrical barrier; (3) Maya's breakdown and the Weapons Section sequence where they fire at what they hope is the creature's control centre.
 Ironically, one part of this under-running story was trimmed.  The epilogue in the Medical Centre would have had Verdeschi, after taking back his love declaration, referring to a model in a magazine he had been reading as being a 'great-looking female'—said model being a normal-appearing Catherine Schell.  Maya would have transformed into Catherine Schell, accused him of having questionable taste, and torn the photograph of herself in half.  Catherine Schell stated that Barbara Bain objected to the idea of Schell being shown in her natural (blonde) appearance and demanded the footage be removed.
 Director Robert Lynn encountered actor and former British Weightlifting Champion David Prowse in Harrods when asking for advice on exercise equipment, and hired him for the physically demanding role of the creature.  Immediately after Space: 1999, Prowse was cast in the equally-concealing part of Darth Vader in the Star Wars film series.

Novelisation 

The episode was adapted in the third Year Two Space: 1999 novel The Space-Jackers by Michael Butterworth, published in 1977.  The narrative differs somewhat from the broadcast version:  to save Verdeschi from the creature, Maya transforms into a two-headed, dragon-bodied, fire-breathing 'Love Beast'.  The Love Beast cannot stand up to the creature and takes a severe beating.  When it changes back into Maya, the transformation does not eliminate the injuries and she spends much of the segment in critical condition in the Medical Centre.  A recovering Alan Carter goes off with Verdeschi to help repel the invader.  Maya's epiphany comes in Medical when Ben Vincent inadvertently refers to the creature as a 'runaway robot' (in a revised version published in Space: 1999—Year Two, it is Sahn calling the creature a 'killing machine').  Later, sustained only by injections of stimulants and pain-killing drugs, she joins the three men for the final showdown at Life-Support.  Sahn is again portrayed as a young Indian man, substituting for Sandra Benes and Yasko during the crisis.

In the 2003 novel The Forsaken written by John Kenneth Muir, it is stated the events of this story were one of the consequences of the death of the eponymous intelligence depicted in "Space Brain".  The Brain provided life support for the xenophobic aliens residing within the cloud; after its death, the beings would be forced to look elsewhere for an alternative.

References

External links 
Space: 1999 - "The Beta Cloud" - The Catacombs episode guide
Space: 1999 - "The Beta Cloud" - Moonbase Alpha's Space: 1999 Page

1976 British television episodes
Space: 1999 episodes